Al-Sawafir al-Gharbiyya was a Palestinian Arab village in the Gaza Subdistrict. It was depopulated during the 1948 War on May 18, 1948, during the second stage of Operation Barak. It was located 30 km northeast of Gaza city.

History
Remains of a winepress and a hypocausts, belonging to a bathhouse, both dating to the late  Roman era, have been excavated here.

Two  cemeteries from the  Byzantine era, together with many ceramic remains from  fifth–seventh centuries CE  have been excavated. Two pool areas, building remains, and parts of a potter's wheel, all dating to the Byzantine era have also been found. A Greek inscription has been found on a limestone slab, and the remains of a wall, with numerous pottery sherds, dating to the Byzantine period (fifth–sixth centuries CE).

Pottery sherds from the Mamluk era has also been found.

Ottoman era
Al-Sawafir al-Gharbiyya was incorporated into the Ottoman Empire in 1517 with the rest of Palestine, and by the 1596 Daftar, the village formed part nahiya (subdistrict) of Gaza under the liwa' (district) of Gaza with a population of 43 households, or an estimated  237 people. All were Muslims.   The villagers  paid a fixed tax-rate of 25% on a number of crops, including wheat, barley, summer crops, vineyards, fruit trees, as well as on goats, beehives; a total of 8,500 Akçe.

In 1838  the three Sawafir villages  were noted  located in  the Gaza district. The western village was noted as "in ruins or deserted,” while the two others were noted as being Muslim.

In 1863 Victor Guérin found  in this  village   a  koubbeh consecrated to a Sheikh   Muhammed. He noted that many antique building blocks were used in this sanctuary.

In 1882  the PEF's Survey of Western Palestine described it as one of three Suafir  adobe villages. Each had small gardens and wells.

British Mandate era
According to the  1922 census of Palestine conducted by the British Mandate authorities, Al-Sawafir al-Gharbiyya had a population of 572 inhabitants, all Muslims,  increasing in the  1931 census when  it  had an all-Muslim  population of 723  in 134 houses.

By the 1945 statistics, this had increased to 1,030 Muslims,   with a total of 7,523 dunams of land.  Of this, 585 dunums were for plantations or irrigable land, 6,663 dunums were for cereals, while 585 dunams were  classified as un-cultivable land.

al-Sawafir al-Gharbiyya had shared a school with the other two Sawafir villages, and in 1945 it had an enrollment of about 280.

1948 and aftermath
In early May, 1948, the inhabitants of the three Al-Sawafir villages were ordered not to flee, by the  Al-Majdal National Committee.
 
On May 18, the Givati Brigade for a second time conquered Al-Sawafir al-Sharqiyya together with Al-Sawafir al-Gharbiyya. Their operational orders were: "To conquer the villages, to cleanse them of inhabitants (women and children should [also] be expelled), to take several prisoners....[and] to burn the greatest number of houses." The Givati troops torched and blew up several houses, however, after they withdrew, the villages returned.  At the 23 May 1948, Israeli reports say that at all the three Al-Sawafir villages the inhabitants slept in the fields at night, but returned to work in the villages by day.  By late  June, both  Al-Sawafir al-Sharqiyya and Al-Sawafir al-Gharbiyya were again  "full of Arabs."

Following the war the area was incorporated into the State of Israel, with the villages of Merkaz Shapira and Masu'ot Yitzhak established on Al-Sawafir al-Gharbiyya land.

References

Bibliography

 
  

   

 

Nasser, G.A. (1955–1973):  "Memoirs" in Journal of Palestine Studies
" “Memoirs of the First Palestine War” in 2, no. 2 (Win. 73): 3–32, pdf-file, downloadable

External links
Welcome To al-Sawafir al-Gharbiyya
al-Sawafir al-Gharbiyya,  Zochrot
Survey of Western Palestine, Map 16:   IAA, Wikimedia commons
al-Sawafir al-Gharbiyya, from the Khalil Sakakini Cultural Center

Arab villages depopulated during the 1948 Arab–Israeli War
District of Gaza